Deh-e Masud (also Romanized as Deh-e Mas‘ūd; also known as Deh-e Mas‘ūdābād) is a village in Moezziyeh Rural District, Chatrud District, Kerman County, Kerman Province, Iran. At the 2006 census, its population was 21, in 7 families.

References 

Populated places in Kerman County